Geliping is a town in Xi District, Panzhihua, Sichuan province, China. , it has two residential neighborhoods and six villages under its administration:
Neighborhoods
Jinlin Community
Jingyi Community
 
Villages
Geliping Village
Xinzhuang Village
Dashuijing Village
Jinjia Village
Zhuangshang Village
Jinqiao Village

See also 
 List of township-level divisions of Sichuan

References 

Township-level divisions of Sichuan
Panzhihua